Chase is a 2019 American action thriller film directed and written by Michael Matteo Rossi. The film stars Damien Puckler, Aries Spears, Richard Riehle, Oghenekaro Itene, Jessica Morris, Simeon Panda, Rob Niter and Skye Townsend.

Plot 
Chase, a muscular hitman, must prove his loyalty to his mentor and best friend, while his girlfriend wants to leave the business behind them.

Cast 
Damien Puckler as Chase
Aries Spears as 	Miles
Richard Riehle as Turley
Oghenekaro Itene as Jayla
Jessica Morris as Blair
Skye Townsend as Lola
Rachel Alig as Megan
Devanny Pinn as Jessie
Harry Hains as Burke
Rob Niter as Nathan
Simeon Panda as Caleb 
Felix Martinsson as Young Chase

Awards 
Chase won the Best Action Film Award at the Hollywood Reel Independent Film Festival.

References

External links 
 
 

2019 films
2010s English-language films